Highway 246 (AR 246, Ark. 246, and Hwy. 246) is a designation of two state highways in Southwest Arkansas. The route begins at the Oklahoma state line and runs east to US Highway 59 (US 59) and US 71 in Hatfield. A second segment begins at US 59/US 71 near Vandervoort and runs east to AR 84. The highways were created in 1963 and 1957, respectively during a period of highway system expansion. Both routes are maintained by the Arkansas Department of Transportation (ArDOT).

History
AR 246 was designated by the Arkansas State Highway Commission on July 10, 1957, during a period of expansion in the state highway system. The Arkansas General Assembly passed the Act 148 of 1957, the Milum Road Act, creating  of new state highways in each county.

The Hatfield segment was created on April 24, 1963. The Vandevoort segment was extended east to the Howard County line in 1965, with a final extension to AR 84 in 1972.

Major intersections

See also

References

External links

246
Transportation in Polk County, Arkansas
Transportation in Howard County, Arkansas